Taxeringskalendern (English: "the tax annual" or "the tax calendar") is the Swedish blanket term for a directory that contains public information on taxed income from work and capital of all natural persons above 18 years of age in Sweden. Some taxeringskalender also include the income of legal persons.

Sweden and the Swedish Tax Agency applies a uniquely, at least compared internationally, high legal transparency regarding the material privacy of individual citizens, only equivalent to Norway and Finland.

In Sweden the first taxeringskalender was published in 1905 (however, SAOB attest the word first in 1923). The two first publishers shall have been AB Förenade Kalenderföretagen, owned by Albert Bonniers förlag, and Kalenderförlaget i Västerås AB. Up until 2008 it also contained assets data on individuals, but since the wealth tax was revoked on January 1, 2007, these are no longer published.

The information comes from the Swedish Tax Agency which in turn get their information from the tax return. All records are based on the previous year. So 2020's taxeringskalender is based on tax returns from 2019, which in turn is based on the income from 2018. This may render the taxeringskalender outdated if the person in question have gotten another job or a pay increase. People who e.g. sold their house without buying a new, e.g. moved to the house of a new spouse, can get a very high one time income listed in the calendar. Newspapers annually list the highest incomes in their publication area.

Today a taxeringskalender is published by Kalenderförlaget in Solna. It is divided after county and is represented by 23 separate editions. Later editions contain a Top-100 list of Sweden's and individual municipalities largest earners. You can also see the average income (divided by age category) in Sweden as a whole, and by each municipality. In 2016 a top list for limited companies was introduced.

Credit agencies have electronic versions of the taxeringskalender from the Swedish Tax Agency and disclose information for payment.

Principle of public access to official records
In Sweden tax returns are covered by confidentiality according to chapter 27 § 1 Offentlighets- och sekretesslagen (2009:400). According to § 6, however, confidentiality according to 1 and 3 §§ does not apply to decisions whereby tax or pensionable income is determined or basis for determining the tax is established.

References

Taxation in Sweden